The  is a railway line in Miyagi Prefecture, Japan, operated by East Japan Railway Company (JR East). It connects Kogota Station in Misato with Onagawa Station in Onagawa, acting as a spur line from the Tōhoku Main Line to the central coast of Miyagi Prefecture. It connects with the Rikuu East Line and Tōhoku Main Line at Kogota Station, the Kesennuma Line at Maeyachi Station, and the Senseki Line at Ishinomaki Station, both in Ishinomaki, Miyagi. The line was damaged by the 2011 Tōhoku earthquake and tsunami, and the damage was so severe that service between Urashuku Station and Onagawa Station was not reinstated until 21 March 2015.

Station list

History

The Senpoku Light Railway opened a  gauge line from Kogota to Ishinomaki in 1912. The line was nationalised in 1919 and converted to  gauge in 1920. The Oshika Light Railway opened a 762 mm gauge horse-drawn tramway from Ishinomaki to Watanoha in 1915, and extended it to Onagawa in 1924. A petrol-driven locomotive was introduced in 1926. The line was nationalised in 1939 and converted to 1,067 mm gauge the same year.

In 1958, the line was extended 1.4 km to the Onagawa Port, but that extension closed in 1980.

The line was severely damaged by the 2011 Tōhoku earthquake and tsunami on 11 March 2011; the Kogota - Ishinomaki section being out of service for two months, the Ishinomaki - Watanoha section for a year, and the Watanoha - Urashuku section for two years. The final section from Urashuku to Onagawa reopened on 21 March 2015.

See also
 List of railway lines in Japan

References

 
Lines of East Japan Railway Company
Railway lines opened in 1912
1912 establishments in Japan
Rail transport in Miyagi Prefecture